Roots Party Kenya (RPK) is a political group party headed by George Wajackoyah. Wajackoya was the presidential candidate and Justina Wamae was the deputy presidential candidate of the alliance. The alliance unveiled its manifesto at Kenyatta International Convention Centre on 30 June 2022. the Roots Party is a radical party without a real ideology but it does lean towards communism.

Slogan and symbol
The party's slogan is "Tingiza Mti" (Swahili for "Shake the Tree"). Their symbol is a tree.

George Wajackoyah's manifesto 
The Root Party has 10 "Commandments of freedom". In Wajackoyah's manifesto speech which occurred at July 30th, 2022, Wajackoyah mentioned in the manifesto that Nairobi is a "corrupt city for the elite" and compared a possible capital change to Isiolo to Nigeria and Tanzania and saying that Nairobi is a slow city, mentioning that Nairobi only has 5 exit ways.

References 

Political parties in Kenya